The Milan is a Kurdish tribe that was historically at the head of a multi-confessional tribal confederacy, and is the subject of one of the legends of origin of Kurds, together with their rivals, the Zilan. The tribal confederacy was most active in the region of Viranşehir, between Urfa, Mardin and Diyarbakir, but the Milan tribe was present in many other places including Dêrsim, Gaziantep and West Azerbaijan Province.

History
The earliest account of the Milan was in the Maku. However, it was not until the Ottoman times, in the 16th century, that they became prominent. They were mentioned in tax registers, as present in Dêrsim as the Lesser and Greater Milli, and they were also the tax-farmers of the district of Mardin. From the early 18th century on, the Ottomans repeatedly attempted to sedentarize the Milan, even giving them the title İskan Başı, or Head of Sedentarization. In 1758 the Ottomans feared the Milli chief Keleş Evdo (Kalash 'Abdi) was trying to set up an autonomous state in the Khabur Valley, and in 1800 they appointed his grandson Milli Timur Paşa as governor of Raqqa in an attempt to contain his ambitions. During the 19th century, however, the Millis gradually lost their position, and came under pressure from the Ottoman government during the Tanzimat reforms. Some of them were deported to Ar Raqqah, where some of the Milan tribal leaders had already been the de facto masters of the region. As such, many notable families of Raqqah could trace their ancestry back to the Milan, though these had been mostly assimilated already in the late 19th century.

Its most renowned chief was Ibrahim Pasha, who led the tribe from 1863 to 1908. He contributed to the building of Viranşehir, and was a Hamidiye regiment leader, but during the massacres of Christians in the late 19th and early 20th centuries, he sheltered Christians and revolted against the Ottomans.

Legend
The Milan, together with the Zilan, are by many tribes considered to be their legendary parental tribe. According to Sykes, Ibrahim Pasha's own explanation was as follows: "Years and years ago the Kurds were divided into two branches, the Milan and Zilan; there were 1,200 tribes of the Milan, but God was displeased with them and they were scattered in all directions, some vanished, others remained; such as remained respect me as the head of the Milan."

One variation adds a third branch, the Baba Kurdi. According to one version of the legend, the Milan settled in Dêrsim, but Sultan Selim ordered some to sedentarize and build houses, and others to nomadize southward.

There's another version of the legend, as recounted by Celadet Bedirxan. In it, the ancestor of the Kurds was a man named
‘Kurd' living on the mountains, who died during heavy snow fall; only two of his sons survived, one was named Mil, the other Zil.

A famous semi-historical Yezidi figure of Kurdish folklore, Derwêşê Evdî, was of the Şerqi tribe of the Milan.

Tribes
Being a tribal confederacy, the Milan historically attracted many and lost many constituent tribes. Next to the Mîlan themselves, the following are the six core tribes.

 Berguhan
 Çemkan
 Dodikan
 Koran
 Şerqiyan
 Tirkan
 Nasıran

References

External links
Iranica

Kurdish tribes